The Lonergan Institute is a center of research at Boston College (a private university in Chestnut Hill, Massachusetts), specialising in the work of Canadian philosopher Bernard Lonergan.

The Institute offers courses and seminars on Lonergan, his principal writings, and subjects that those writings illuminate, such as hermeneutics, political theology, science and religion, Christology, aesthetics, self-knowledge, economics, the Trinity, and the history and philosophy of science and mathematics.

The Lonergan Institute is also responsible for the Perspectives and PULSE programs at Boston College; these are interdisciplinary projects dealing with philosophy, theology, service, and other aspects of academia.

External links
Lonergan Institute

Boston College
Philosophy institutes
Bernard Lonergan